Jodie White (born 22 September 1980) is an Australian rules footballer who played for the Fremantle Football Club in the AFL Women's (AFLW). White was drafted by Fremantle with their third selection and eighteenth overall in the 2017 AFL Women's draft. She was delisted by Fremantle at the end of the 2018 season.

References

External links 

1980 births
Living people
Fremantle Football Club (AFLW) players
Australian rules footballers from Western Australia